Neda Ghasemi (born June 20, 1987) is a dubber and actress in Iranian theater and television.

Biography, diary 
Ghasemi was born in Kermanshah, Iran on June 20, 1987. She started acting in the theater in 2007. Then he collaborated with this center in Kermanshah Central Radio and Television as an actor and presenter in various programs and since 1993 he has been working as an announcer, dubber and actor in Kermanshah Radio Show Unit. He is also a PhD student in Organic Chemistry at the University of Tehran.

Artistic activity 
In addition to acting in theater and television, he is also engaged in dubbing. She started acting in theater at the age of 20, and in 1995, she was nominated for Best Actress at the 35th Fajr International Theater Festival for her occasional performance. He also gained his first experience of acting on TV by playing a role in the TV series Noon Khe, made by Saeed Agakhani.

"The further we go, the more the writer sees the characters in the actors, and naturally, he becomes more aware than before of what he writes for the actor and what adventures and characteristics engage him," he said of Shirin and her marriage story. Neda Ghasemi has played a role in the radio series "Purple Heart" directed by Mirtaher Mazloumi.

References

External links

Living people
1987 births
Iranian film actresses
Iranian stage actresses
Iranian television presenters
Iranian women television presenters
Iranian radio and television presenters